Destination Ontario, legally the Ontario Tourism Marketing Partnership Corporation (OTMPC;  (SPOMT)), is an agency of the Government of Ontario in the province of Ontario in Canada. Established in 1999, Destination Ontario has the mission to promote Tourism in Ontario and reports to the Ministry of Heritage, Sport, Tourism and Culture Industries (Ontario).

With the vision of promoting the province of Ontario as a preferred global destination, Destination Ontario's stated mission is to generate increased visitation by Ontarian, Canadian, and International tourists; to enhance tourism expenditures in Ontario; and to contribute to the provincial economic prosperity through impactful marketing and results-oriented investment partnerships. The agency endeavours to:

 market Ontario as a travel destination
 undertake joint marketing initiatives with the tourism industry
 support and assist the marketing efforts of the tourism industry
 work in cooperation with the tourism industry, the Government of Ontario, other governments and other agencies of governments

Destination Ontario works directly with its Canadian federal counterpart, Destination Canada, in cooperation to increase visitation to both the province and the country. It has operated marketing campaigns in many jurisdictions, including Ontario, other Canadian provinces, the United States, the United Kingdom, Germany, France, China and Japan. Destination Ontario often markets under the slogan "Yours to Discover", a brand that represents the ideology of what Ontario is as a province – a destination where one discovery leads to another.

The organization is headed by an 8-person board of directors which is overseen by a President and chief executive officer, chosen from the combined private and public sector nature of the industry to represent the various regions of the province.

Websites 

 Consumer website: https://destinationontario.com/ 
 Corporate website: https://destinationontario.com/corporate
 Official Blog (English): ontario-travel.blog 
 Official Blog (French): voyage-ontario.blog

See also 

 Tourism in Ontario
 Destination Canada

References 

Government of Ontario